Thermal paste (also called thermal compound, thermal grease, thermal interface material (TIM), thermal gel, heat paste, heat sink compound, heat sink paste or CPU grease) is a thermally conductive (but usually electrically insulating) chemical compound, which is commonly used as an interface between heat sinks and heat sources such as high-power semiconductor devices. The main role of thermal paste is to eliminate air gaps or spaces (which act as thermal insulation) from the interface area in order to maximize heat transfer and dissipation. Thermal paste is an example of a thermal interface material.

As opposed to thermal adhesive, thermal paste does not add mechanical strength to the bond between heat source and heat sink. It has to be coupled with a fastener such as screws to hold the heat sink in place and to apply pressure, spreading and thinning the thermal paste.

Composition 
Thermal paste consists of a polymerizable liquid matrix and large volume fractions of electrically insulating, but thermally conductive filler. Typical matrix materials are epoxies, silicones (silicone grease), urethanes, and acrylates; solvent-based systems, hot-melt adhesives, and pressure-sensitive adhesive tapes are also available. Aluminum oxide, boron nitride, zinc oxide, and increasingly aluminum nitride are used as fillers for these types of adhesives. The filler loading can be as high as 70–80% by mass, and raises the thermal conductivity of the base matrix from 0.17–0.3 W/(m·K) (watts per meter-kelvin) up to about 4 W/(m·K), according to a 2008 paper.

Silver thermal compounds may have a conductivity of 3 to 8 W/(m·K) or more, and consist of micronized silver particles suspended in a silicone/ceramic medium. However, metal-based thermal paste can be electrically conductive and capacitive; if some flows onto the circuits, it can lead to malfunction and damage.

The most effective (and most expensive) pastes consist almost entirely of liquid metal, usually a variation of the alloy galinstan, and have thermal conductivities in excess of 13 W/(m·K). These are difficult to apply evenly and have the greatest risk of causing malfunction due to spillage. These pastes contain gallium, which is highly corrosive to aluminium and cannot be used on aluminium heat sinks.

The lifespan of thermal paste varies depending on the manufacturer and typically ranges from 3 to 5 years.

Uses 
Thermal paste is used to improve the heat coupling between different components. A common application is to drain away waste heat generated by electrical resistance in semiconductor devices including power transistors, CPUs, GPUs, and LED COBs. Cooling these devices is essential because excess heat rapidly degrades their performance and can cause a runaway to catastrophic failure of the device due to the negative temperature coefficient property of semiconductors.

Factory PCs and laptops (though seldom tablets or smartphones) typically incorporate thermal paste between the top of the CPU case and a heat sink for cooling. Thermal paste is sometimes also used between the CPU die and its integrated heat spreader, though solder is sometimes used instead.

When a CPU heat spreader is coupled to the die via thermal paste, performance enthusiasts such as overclockers are able to, in a process known as "delidding", pry the heat spreader, or CPU "lid", from the die. This allows them to replace the thermal paste, which is usually of low-quality, with a thermal paste having greater thermal conductivity. Generally, liquid metal thermal pastes are used in such instances.

Challenges 

The consistency of thermal paste makes it susceptible to failure mechanisms distinct from some other thermal interface materials. A common one is pump-out, which is the loss of thermal paste from between the die and the heat sink due to their differing rates of thermal expansion and contraction. Over a large number of power cycles, thermal paste gets pumped out from between the die and the heat sink and eventually causes degradation of thermal performance.

Another issue with some compounds is the separation of the polymer and filler matrix components occurs under high temperatures. The loss of polymeric material can result in poor wettability, leading to increased thermal resistance.

See also
 Computer cooling
 Hot-melt adhesive
 Phase-change material
 Thermally conductive pad
 List of thermal conductivities

References

External links 
 

Adhesives
Cooling technology
Computer hardware cooling
 
Conduction